Georges Guynemer (24 December 1894 – 11 September 1917 MIA) was the second highest-scoring French fighter ace with 54 victories during World War I, and a French national hero at the time of his death. Guynemer's death was a profound shock to France.

Early life and military career

Georges Marie Ludovic Jules Guynemer was born in Paris to a wealthy and aristocratic family. His father was Paul Guynemer. His mother, Julie Noémi Doynel de Saint-Quentin's ancestry included King Louis XIV. Guynemer experienced an often sickly childhood. Nevertheless, he succeeded as an aviator through his enormous drive and self-confidence.

He was originally rejected five times for military service due to frailty, but was accepted for training as a mechanic in late 1914.  With determination, he gained acceptance to pilot training, joining Escadrille MS.3 on 8 June 1915. He remained in the same unit for his entire service.<ref name="Early Birds of Aviation, inc.">– The Most Brilliant Stork </ref> The first plane allocated to him was a Morane-Saulnier L monoplane previously flown by Charles Bonnard, and accordingly named Vieux Charles (Old Charles). Guynemer kept the name and continued to use it for most of his later aircraft. On 19 July 1915, he shot down his first plane, a German Aviatik.

On 5 December 1915, the Escadrille MS.3 was renamed the Escadrille N.3, after being re-equipped with new Nieuport 10 fighters. Flying the more effective plane, Guynemer quickly established himself as one of France's premier fighter pilots. He became an ace, with his fifth victory coming in February 1916, and was promoted to lieutenant in March. On 12 March 1916 he scored his 8th victory. At the end of the year, his score had risen to 25. Capitaine Brocard, commander of Escadrille N.3 (Storks), described Guynemer at that time as "...my most brilliant Stork." Less than a year later, Guynemer was promoted to captain and commander of the Storks squadron.

Guynemer became influential enough to affect French fighter aircraft design. In December 1916, he wrote a letter to the chief designer at Spad, criticizing the Spad VII as inferior to the German Halberstadt that was its contemporary. As a consequence, Spad developed two new but very similar models, the SPAD XII and SPAD XIII. The new models were promising, but had teething problems with the reduction gear between engine and propeller.

On 23 January 1917 Guynemer scored a "double" credit of victories 26 and 27, first shooting down an Albatros C piloted by Captain Martin Korner, who was killed, followed by a Rumpler C I of Flieger-Abteilung (A) 216 piloted by Lt.  Bernhard Röder and his observer Lt. Otto von Schanzenbach who were both killed. On 26 January 1917 Guynemer forced down an Albatros C.VII of Flieger-Abteilung (A) 226 whose crew was captured for his 30th credit. On 8 February 1917, flying a SPAD VII, Guynemer became the first Allied pilot to shoot down a German Gotha bomber, his 31st victory. On 16 March 1917 he brought down his 32nd credit, a Roland D.II of Jasta 32 whose pilot was captured. On 14 April 1917 he downed his 36th credit, by killing a crew from Flieger-Abteilung (A) 254. His highest scoring month was May 1917, when he downed seven German aircraft including a quadruple credit on 25 May. By July, he began to fly the Spad XII; his avion magique was, at his behest, armed with a  cannon whose barrel fired through the propeller shaft. It was also armed with a  air-cooled Vickers machine gun. Although the cannon promised devastating firepower, the new plane was a handful because of it, as the cannon's rearwards-protruding breech mandated separate aileron and elevator controls split from each other on opposing sides of the cockpit. The single shot cannon had to also be manually reloaded in flight; it had a heavy recoil when fired and filled the canopy with fumes with every shot. The Spad XII was not a plane for a novice pilot. However, Guynemer used it to down an Albatros fighter on 27 July, and a DFW the next day. The latter triumph made him the first French ace to attain 50 victories, with headlines such as "Fifty machines destroyed! This had been Guynemer's dream!" written in the newspapers.

Death

Guynemer failed to return from a combat mission on 11 September 1917. The previous week had been one of mechanical ills, in both his assigned aircraft and the ones he borrowed. At 08:30, with rookie pilot Jean Bozon-Verduraz, Guynemer took off in his Spad XIII S.504 n°2. His mission was to patrol the Langemark area. At 09:25, near Poelkapelle, Guynemer sighted a lone Rumpler, a German observation plane, and dove toward it. Bozon-Verduraz saw several Fokkers above him, and by the time he had shaken them off, his leader was nowhere in sight, so he returned alone. Guynemer never came back.

Guynemer was confirmed missing in action by his squadron commander Major Brocard; it was officially announced in Paris by the French War Department on 25 September 1917. Unofficial confirmation came from a captured German pilot who was shot down behind Canadian lines the evening of 29 September. A German sergeant from the 413th Regiment swore he had witnessed the crash and identified Guynemer's corpse; he also certified that he had died from a bullet through the head, with other injuries including a broken leg and a finger shot away. The German party retrieving the body was driven away by Allied artillery fire before they could bury or remove the body. The 25 September details released by the French War Department were unclassified and became public knowledge as described by one of his flying comrades (name withheld due to security reasons):

Guynemer sighted five machines of the Albatros type D-3. Without hesitation, he bore down on them. At that moment enemy patrolling machines, soaring at a great height, appeared suddenly and fell upon Guynemer. There were forty enemy machines in the air at this time, including Baron von Richthofen and his circus division of machines, painted in diagonal blue and white stripes. Toward Guynemer's right some Belgian machines hove in sight, but it was too late. Guynemer must have been hit. His machine dropped gently toward the Earth, and I lost track of it. All that I can say is that the machine was not on fire.

Additional details were furnished by Major Brocard, as listed in an article from the Paris Le Matin:

The last fight of the French aviator occurred four or five miles inside the German lines northeast of Ypres and opposite the British lines. Captain Guynemer was accompanied by Lieutenant Bozon Verduraz, who says that they were flying at a height of 15,000 feet when Guynemer sighted an enemy two-seater, which he attacked. Almost at the same moment Verduraz saw four German monoplanes approaching and turned toward them instantly so as to draw them off. They circled around for a while and then disappeared. Verduraz then returned to the place where he had left Guynemer engaged with the German biplane, but Guynemer had vanished.

The two-seater, described as a Rumpler type by Bozon-Verduraz, has never been identified, but recent research shows that it could have been a machine flown by Lt. d. R. Max Psaar (observer) and Fl. Georg Seibert (pilot) from FA(A)224. German ace Kurt Wissemann of Jasta 3 was credited with the victory. Wissemann would himself be killed in action little more than two weeks later on 28 September 1917.

According to an American Red Cross communique from the French front, the death of Guynemer was determined to be "definitely confirmed". This Red Cross report provided these details:

Information received by the Red Cross says Guynemer was shot through the head north of Poelcapelle, on the Ypres front. His body was identified by a photograph on his pilot's license found in his pocket. The burial took place at Brussels in the presence of a guard of honor, composed of the 5th Prussian Division. Such is the story told by a Belgian, who has just escaped from the Germans. The burial was about to take place at Poelcapelle, when the bombardment preceding the British attack at Ypres started. The burying party hastily withdrew, taking the body with them. The German General chanced to be an aviation enthusiast with a great admiration for Captain Guynemer's achievements. At his direction the body was taken to Brussels in a special funeral car. Thither the captain was carried by non-commissioned officers and was covered with floral tributes from German aviators. The Prussian Guards stood at salute upon its arrival and during the burial, which was given all possible military honors. The French Government has been invited to place in the Pantheon, where many great Frenchmen are buried, an inscription to perpetuate the memory of Captain Guynemer as 'a symbol of the aspirations and enthusiasm of the Army.' A resolution to this effect has been introduced in the Chamber of Deputies by Deputy Lasies.

Guynemer had 54 victories at the time of his death.

Legacy

Guynemer was lionized by the French press and became a national hero. The French government encouraged the publicity to boost morale and take the people's minds off the terrible losses in the trenches. Guynemer was embarrassed by the attention, but his shyness only increased the public's appetite to know everything about him. This was quite different later in 1918 with the French top ace René Fonck, who despite having 75 confirmed victories, had bad publicity for his arrogance and shameless self-promotion. Guynemer's death was a profound shock to France; nevertheless, he remained an icon for the duration of the war. Only 22 at his death, he continued to inspire the nation with his advice, "Until one has given all, one has given nothing."

The Paris street rue Guynemer is named after him as is a school in Compiègne, the Institution Guynemer.
A statue is erected in Poelcapelle in commemoration of Georges Guynemer.

The episode "The Last Flight" (1960) from season one of the American television series The Twilight Zone was loosely based on the disappearance of Guynemer put to fictional speculation as to what happened to him.

He was decorated Order of Karađorđe's Star with swords and a number of other decorations.

See also
French Air Force
List of people who disappeared
List of World War I flying acesWhen the World was WideAncestry

Notes

See also
 Arthur Constantin Krebs, father of Jean Krebs, the college friend of Georges Guynemer

ReferencesSPAD XII/XIII aces of World War I. Jon Guttman. Osprey Publishing, 2002. , 9781841763163.
Bordeaux, Henry. (1918) "Guynemer: Knight of the Air." Translated from French by Louise Morgan Sill. Yale University Press; Second Printing.
Franks, Norman L. R. & Bailey W. (1992) "Over The Front; A Complete Record of the Fighter Aces And Units of the United States And French Services, 1914-1918." Grub Street, London, .
Guttman, Jon. (2004) "Groupe de Combat 12, France's Ace Fighter Group in World War 1." Aviation Elite Units Osprey Publishing. INBN 978 1 84176 753 6.

 Musciano, Walter A. Capt. Georges Guynemer: W.W.I Eagle of France''. New York: Hobby Helpers, 1963.

External links

Georges Guynemer – Detailed biography and color profiles of his planes
Georges Guynemer – "Who's Who" at FirstWorldWar.com
Georges Guynemer – "a beloved French Ace" at Acepilots.com
Georges Guynemer page at theaerodrome.com
Georges Guynemer: France's World War I Ace Pilot at Historynet.com

1894 births
1910s missing person cases
1917 deaths
Aerial disappearances of military personnel in action
Aviators killed in aviation accidents or incidents in Belgium
Collège Stanislas de Paris alumni
French aviators
French military personnel killed in World War I
French World War I flying aces
Missing in action of World War I
Missing person cases in Belgium
Military personnel from Paris
Recipients of the Croix de Guerre 1914–1918 (France)